Sardar Ramesh Singh Arora (born 10 November 1974) is a Pakistani politician and social worker.

Biography
Arora was born in 1974 to a Punjabi Sikh family in Nankana Sahib. His family left Lyallpur to settle in Nankana Sahib in 1965. He received a Master's degree from the University of the Punjab in 1997 and thereafter began work with the World Bank as a microfinance and institutional development specialist. He graduated with an MBA in 2000.

In 2013, he became the first Sikh in 63 years to be elected as a Member of the Provincial Assembly of the Punjab. He served as a Member of the National Commission for Minorities between 2011 and 2013, General Secretary of the Pakistan Sikh Gurdwara Prabandhak Committee during 2009-13 and as Chief Executive of the Mojaz Foundation between 2008 and 2013. He currently acts as Chairman of the Standing Committee on Commerce & Investment, is Patron-in-chief of the Pakistan Sikh Council, and a member of the Pakistan Sikh Gurdwara Prabandhak Committee.

References

Pakistani Sikhs
Punjabi people
Pakistan Muslim League (N) politicians
Living people
People from Nankana Sahib District
University of the Punjab alumni
Pakistani social workers
1974 births